Nattawut Jaroenboot (born 27 April 1991) is a Thai professional footballer who plays as a midfielder for Thai League 1 club Sukhothai

References

External links

1991 births
Living people
Nattawut Jaroenboot
Nattawut Jaroenboot
Nattawut Jaroenboot
Association football midfielders
Nattawut Jaroenboot
Nattawut Jaroenboot